, also known as Konishi Hayato, was a Japanese samurai of the late Sengoku period. He was the younger brother of the Christian daimyo, Konishi Yukinaga.

He fought bravely against Kato Kiyomasa in the Siege of Udo, killing Kato's senior retainer. After he found out the western army had been defeated, he decided to surrender.  He committed seppuku in exchange for assurances that all his vassals would be spared and hired with the same salary.

Yukikage was buried in Zenjoji Temple, Kumamoto, by Nanjo Motokiyo. His grave is marked with a small uninscribed stone surrounded by the gravestones of Konishi vassals as if they are protecting it. It is said that Konishi Yukinaga's remains had been moved from Kyoto to be buried with his brother.

References 

1561 births
1600 deaths
Samurai
Suicides by seppuku
People of Sengoku-period Japan